Prithviraj, Pruthviraj or Prithvi Raj may refer to:

Mononym
 Prithviraja I (r. c. 1090-1110), Indian king from the Shakambhari Chahamana dynasty
 Prithviraja II (r. c. 1165-1169), Indian king from the Shakambhari Chahamana dynasty
 Prithviraja III (r. c. 1178–1192), better known as Prithviraj Chauhan, Indian king from the Shakambhari Chahamana dynasty
 Prithviraj Singh I (r. c. 1503–1527), Indian king of Amber
 Prudhvi Raj (born 1964), Indian Telugu actor, known as Pruthviraj
 Prithvi Raj (cricketer), Indian cricketer

Given name
 Prithviraj Chavan (born 1946), Indian politician, chief minister of Maharashtra
 Prithviraj Kapoor (1906–1972), Indian theatre and film actor
 Prithviraj Sukumaran (born 1982), Indian actor, director and producer

Other uses
 Babloo Prithviraj (born 1966), Tamil and Telugu film and television actor
 Samrat Prithviraj, a 2022 Indian Hindi film
 Prithviraj Road, a road in New Delhi

See also
Pithora (disambiguation), alternate rendition of Prithviraj
 Prithviraj Chauhan (disambiguation)